The VTech Precomputer 1000 is an electronic learning aid for ages 9 and above manufactured by VTech and released in 1988 (USA) and 1989 (Europe). It contains a dot matrix LCD screen, and a standard size keyboard. It features a number of activities, including trivia on science, history and general knowledge.

The PreComputer 1000 is VTech's first child learning product to incorporate the BASIC programming language and is the predecessor to the PreComputer 2000.

Specifications
The VTech PreComputer 1000 relies upon a Zilog Z84C0004PEC (a  Z80B clone) as its processing core. A 16Kbit (2Kx8bit) 2K Sharp LH5116-10 or Hyundai HY6116ALP-10 SRAM is used for RAM. As of 1992, a CMOS version of the Z80 marketed as the Z84 is used.

A Toshiba TC531000CP 1MBit (128Kx8bit) 128K ROM contains the Operating System and program data. This ROM can be augmented when a cartridge is inserted into the side mounted cartridge slot and then selected, thus providing expansion capability.

Text output is supplied by a single row 20 character dot-matrix LCD panel, sound output is via an inbuilt piezo element beeper.

Functions 
The following functions are available on the unit:
 Typing course
 Fact quizzes (250 facts in each of the following categories: General Knowledge, History, Science & Geography)
 Mathematics activities (5 activities for 1 or 2 players)
 Games (1 single player typing game, Hangman and Scramble)
 Calculator
 BASIC (stylized as PRE-BASIC 1.0) programming with 9 example programs

BASIC implementation 
PRE-BASIC 1.0 is a simplified unstructured BASIC implementation includes a simple line editor with the ability to change, insert or delete characters on a program line.

Supported features include:

 Single character variable names for numbers and strings 
 String and numeric arrays up to three dimensions
 Data manipulation with LET.. DATA.. READ.. RESTORE
 Input and output with LIST.. PRINT.. INPUT
 Mathematical functions (e.g. ABS, SGN, TAN)
 Logical operations (e.g. NOT, OR, AND)
 String handling (e.g. LEFT$, CHR$)
 Flow control with  IF.. THEN.. ELSE, FOR.. TO.. NEXT.. STEP and GOSUB.. RETURN
 Single channel sound with 31 notes and 9 durations

Expansion Cartridges 
The following cartridges were available for the PreComputer 1000 and also supported in the PreComputer 2000. The cartridges could only be inserted with the power off before re-powering and pressing the 'Cartridge' button to activate.

 Bible Knowledge (Stock Code: 80-0989)
 Fantasy Trivia (Stock Code: 80-1001)
 General Knowledge II (Stock Code: 80-1002) 
 Super Science (Stock Code: 80-1410) 
 Speller (Stock Code: 80-1004) 
 Famous places and things (Stock Code: 80-1533) - Marketed for both PreComputer 1000 and 2000

The same Toshiba TC531000CP 128K ROM is used in some cartridges.

References

External links
 20th Century Retro Games entry (Gallery page for VTech models 1000, 1000 jr, 2000, ProScreen and Variety)
 BASIC for Kids: The VTech PreComputer 1000 at Vintage Computing and Gaming (May 31, 2007 by Benj Edwards)
 5 Amazing '80s Geek Toys and Their Modern Equivalents at Wired (magazine) (June 1, 2012 by Chuck Lawton. Machines include: 100-in-1 electronics kits, Pre-Computer 1000, Etch-a-sketch Animator, Casio VL-1 Keyboard, Meccano Erector Sets.)

PreComputer 1000